Abraham Albert Heaps (December 24, 1885 – April 4, 1954), known as A. A. Heaps, was a Canadian politician and labour leader. A strong labourite, he served as MP for Winnipeg North from 1925 to 1940.

Born in  Leeds, England, Heaps emigrated to Canada in 1911 and worked in Winnipeg as an upholsterer. He was one of the leaders of the Winnipeg general strike of 1919 and was a Labour alderman on the Winnipeg City Council from 1917 to 1925.

He ran for the House of Commons of Canada as a Labour candidate in 1923 in the riding of Winnipeg North but was defeated.

He was elected in the 1925 election and joined J. S. Woodsworth as the only Labour MPs in Parliament. The Liberal government of William Lyon Mackenzie King was elected with a minority government. Heaps and Woodsworth agreed to support the Liberals in exchange for the government creating Canada's first old age pension. Heaps and Woodsworth joined other left-wing MPs to form the Ginger Group.

He was a founding member of the Co-operative Commonwealth Federation in 1932, and was a charter member of the CCF's caucus.
 
One of the few Jews in Parliament, Heaps pushed the government to allow Jewish refugees from the Nazis into Canada, but with little success.

He was defeated in the 1940 election by Charles Stephen Booth from the Liberal Party due to a strong candidacy in Winnipeg North by the Communist Party's candidate.

Heaps died in England while visiting family and was buried in his birthplace of Leeds.

His son, Leo Heaps, wrote a 1984 biography about him called The Rebel in the House: The Life and Times of A.A. Heaps MP and was an unsuccessful New Democratic Party candidate in the 1979 federal election for the riding of Eglinton—Lawrence. His grandson, Adrian Heaps, was elected to Toronto City Council in 2006.

References

Abraham Heaps fonds, Library and Archives Canada
 Heaps, Leo. The Rebel in the House: the Life and Times of A.A. Heaps, M[ember of Canadian] P[arliament]. London: Niccolo Publishing Co., 1970. 168 p. Without ISBN

External links
 
 Abraham Albert Heaps at The Canadian Encyclopedia
 Manitoba Heritage Council Commemorative Plaques

1885 births
1954 deaths
Canadian people of English-Jewish descent
Canadian socialists
Co-operative Commonwealth Federation MPs
English emigrants to Canada
Ginger Group MPs
Jewish Canadian politicians
Labour MPs in Canada
Labour candidates in the 1926 Canadian federal election
Members of the House of Commons of Canada from Manitoba
People from Leeds
Winnipeg city councillors
Persons of National Historic Significance (Canada)
People of the Winnipeg general strike